Simon David Archer MBE (born 27 June 1973) is an English former badminton player. Archer once held the world record for the fastest smash at 162 mph.

Career

Summer Olympics 
Archer competed in badminton at the 1996 Summer Olympics in doubles, with Chris Hunt. They were knocked out in the quarterfinals. In 2000 he coupled with Nathan Robertson, but they too lost in the quarterfinals, this time to Tony Gunawan and Candra Wijaya of Indonesia. However, Archer also competed in mixed doubles with Joanne Goode and won a bronze medal.

Commonwealth Games 
He represented England and won double silver in the mixed doubles and men's doubles event and was a member of the mixed team that won the gold medal, at the 1994 Commonwealth Games in Victoria, Canada.

Archer and Goode won gold medals twice at the Commonwealth Games in 1998 and 2002. Archer also won bronze medals in men's doubles in both these Games, together with Chris Hunt and James Anderson respectively.

Retirement 
In August 2006 Archer announced, that he will no longer compete on international level. However he still plays county badminton for Worcestershire and has had an offer to play for a club in Germany.

Personal life 
Archer was appointed Member of the Order of the British Empire (MBE) in the 2004 Queen's Birthday Honours.

Achievements

Olympic Games 
Mixed doubles

World Championships 
Men's doubles

Mixed doubles

Commonwealth Games 
Men's doubles

Mixed doubles

European Championships 
Men's doubles

Mixed doubles

European Junior Championships 
Boys' singles

Mixed doubles

IBF World Grand Prix 
The World Badminton Grand Prix sanctioned by International Badminton Federation (IBF) from 1983 to 2006.

Men's doubles

Mixed doubles

IBF International 
Men's doubles

Mixed doubles

References

External links 
 Simon Archer at BadmintonEngland.co.uk
 
 
 

1973 births
Living people
Sportspeople from Worcester, England
English male badminton players
Badminton players at the 1996 Summer Olympics
Badminton players at the 2000 Summer Olympics
Olympic badminton players of Great Britain
Olympic bronze medallists for Great Britain
Olympic medalists in badminton
Medalists at the 2000 Summer Olympics
Badminton players at the 1994 Commonwealth Games
Badminton players at the 1998 Commonwealth Games
Badminton players at the 2002 Commonwealth Games
Badminton players at the 2006 Commonwealth Games
Commonwealth Games gold medallists for England
Commonwealth Games silver medallists for England
Commonwealth Games bronze medallists for England
Commonwealth Games medallists in badminton
Members of the Order of the British Empire
Medallists at the 1994 Commonwealth Games
Medallists at the 1998 Commonwealth Games
Medallists at the 2002 Commonwealth Games
Medallists at the 2006 Commonwealth Games